Por Tu Maldito Amor (Because of Your Damn Love) is the fifteenth studio album by Mexican Mariachi singer Vicente Fernández, released in 1989 through Sony Music Latin. The album remained atop the US Billboard Regional Mexican Albums chart for 21 consecutive weeks. It was certified Paltinum by the Recording Industry Association of America (RIAA) for shipments of 100,000 units in the United States.

Track listing

Charts

Weekly charts

Certifications

References 

1989 albums
Sony Music Latin albums
Spanish-language albums
Vicente Fernández albums